The Women's Basketball Super League (KBSL), also known as the Herbalife Nutrition Women's Basketball Super League for sponsorship reasons, is the top women's professional basketball division of the Turkish women's basketball league system. The league was established in 1980 and is organized by the Turkish Basketball Federation. There is also a Turkish Women’s Basketball League (TKBL), the second level in the Turkish women's basketball league system.

Fenerbahçe are the most successful team in competition history, having won 16 championship titles to date.

Competition system
The competition is played in two phases: regular season and playoffs. There are 14 teams in the league and they play against each other twice in the league manner, once at their home and the other away. At the end of the season, the top eight teams qualify for the playoff games. The two lowest placed teams of the Super League, ranking 13th and 14th, relegate into the Second League (TKBL). The two top teams of the Second League are promoted to the Super League.

The playoffs follow a tournament format in three rounds for eight teams: quarterfinals, semifinals and finals. The four winners of the quarterfinals advance to the semifinal round. The two victors of the semifinals compete in the final playoff round for the championship title.

Performance by club

Current clubs (2021–22 season)

Champions

Notable players

Domestic Players

Işıl Alben
Gülşah Akkaya
Melike Bakırcıoğlu
Tuğçe Canıtez
Bahar Çağlar
Olcay Çakır
Begüm Dalgalar
Selin Ekiz
Burcu Erbaş
Seda Erdoğan
Duygu Fırat
Ecem Güler
Gülşah Gümüşay
Yasemin Horasan
Tuğçe İnöntepe
Naile İvegin
Şaziye İvegin
Özge Kavurmacıoğlu
Ceyda Kozluca
Şebnem Kimyacıoğlu
Sariye Kumral
Tuğçe Murat
Arzu Özyiğit
Tuğba Palazoğlu
Nalan Ramazanoğlu
Kübra Siyahdemir
Yasemen Saylar
Esra Şencebe
Devran Tanaçan
Esmeral Tunçluer 
Birsel Vardarlı
Aylin Yıldızoğlu
Nevriye Yılmaz 
Nilay Yiğit
Serap Yücesir
Müjde Yüksel

European Players

Anastasiya Verameyenka
Marina Kress
Sviatlana Volnaya
Yelena Leuchanka

Gergena Baranzova 

Korana Longin-Zanze

Hana Horáková

Alba Torrens

Linda Frohlich

Émilie Gomis 
Isabelle Yacoubou 

Andrea Nagy
Anna Vajda

Shay Doron

Elīna Babkina
Anete Jēkabsone-Žogota
Zane Tamane

Gintarė Petronytė

Agnieszka Bibrzycka

Elena Baranova
Epiphanny Prince 

Milica Dabović
Ivona Jerković
Ivana Matović
Ivanka Matić
Jelena Spirić

Non-European Players

Penny Taylor 

Tammy Sutton-Brown

Candace Parker
Marissa Coleman
Lindsey Harding
Matee Ajavon 
Chantelle Anderson
Seimone Augustus
Kara Braxton
Kiesha Brown
Tamika Catchings
Tina Charles
Monique Currie
Clarissa Davis
Peony Nazario
Diamond DeShields
Bethany Donaphin
Katie Douglas
Summer Erb
Marie Ferdinand-Harris
Sylvia Fowles
Andrea Gardner
Laura Harper
Vanessa Hayden
Doneeka Hodges
Ebony Hoffman
Alexis Hornbuckle
Katrina McClain Johnson
Shannon Johnson
Vickie Johnson
Ivory Latta
Erlana Larkins
Doneeka Lewis
Stacey Lovelace-Tolbert
Angel McCoughtry
Danielle McCulley
Taj McWilliams-Franklin
Coco Miller
Kelly Miller
Courtney Paris
Jia Perkins
Cappie Pondexter
Nicole Powell
Sheri Sam
Katie Smith
Tangela Smith
Andrea Stinson
Diana Taurasi
Nikki Teasley
Barbara Turner
Sophia Young
Tan White

Players written in italic still play in the league.

See also 
 Men's
 Turkish Men's Basketball League  
 Turkish Men's Basketball Cup
 Turkish Men's Basketball Presidential Cup
 Women's
 Turkish Women's Super League
 Turkish Women's Basketball Cup
 Turkish Women's Basketball Presidential Cup

References

External links
Official Website 
Eurobasket.com Turkish Women's Basketball League 
Turkish Basketball Federation Official Website 

 
Women
1980 establishments in Turkey
Turkey
Sports leagues established in 1980
lea
Professional sports leagues in Turkey